Boonreung Buachan, (sometimes spelled Boonruang and Bauchan; 1969 – March 22, 2004) was a Thai man known for his ability to handle snakes, especially cobras, which he demonstrated in public performances. In 1998, he set the Guinness Book of World Records title for spending the most time in a container with snakes by staying inside a glass box with the snakes for seven days.

Buachan died on March 24, 2004, after being bitten by a cobra during his daily show in Prai Bung, Thailand. He continued with his show, after drinking some herbal medicine and a shot of whiskey, until he collapsed in what looked like an epileptic seizure. He was taken while unconscious to Prai Bung Hospital, where he died. He received a Darwin Award for his death.

Buachan had epilepsy.

References

Further reading

Deaths due to snake bites
2004 deaths
Boonreung Buachan
1969 births
People with epilepsy